Marci Miller (born August 2, 1988) is an American model and actress. She portrayed the role of Abigail Deveraux on the NBC soap opera Days of Our Lives from 2016 to 2018 and from 2020 to 2022. Miller's performance of Abigail has been met with critical acclaim, earning three Daytime Emmy Award nominations for Outstanding Lead Actress in a Drama Series in 2018, 2019 and 2022.

Early life 
Miller was born and raised in the small farming town of North Liberty, Indiana (pop 1,900), and attended the local John Glenn High School. Where she excelled in Basketball and Theatre. She studied Vocal Performance at nearby Bethel College. After graduating college, she moved to Louisville, Kentucky, to pursue theatrical opportunities followed by moving to Los Angeles where she studied Film Master Class at Baron Brown Studio, in Santa Monica, California. Miller has a younger sister who is named after the iconic Days of Our Lives character, Kayla Brady.

Career 
In late 2015, Miller joined the cast of American Fable as Gavin MacIntosh's mother, in the lead role of Sarah. In June 2016, it was announced that Miller had joined the cast of Days of Our Lives, in the role of Abigail Deveraux, making her first appearance on November 10. In addition to her aforementioned roles, she has starred in a number of movies, including: Most Likely to Die, J Plus C, Children of the Corn: Runaway and Death Race 2050, as well as a number of short films. In May 2018, Soap Opera Digest announced Miller had opted not to renew her deal would Days of Our Lives and would exit the role. In June 2020, it was announced that Miller would return to the role. In February 2021, Miller and husband Ryan were featured as a rollerskating couple in a music video for disco pop duo JUICYPEAR’s single “Keep Your Love On.”

Personal life 
Miller is married to Ryan Matteson. She also helps with her husband's organic farm-to-table business, KaleCart.

Marci gave birth to their daughter in March 2021.

Filmography

Awards and nominations

References

External links
 
 

American television actresses
American film actresses
American soap opera actresses
Living people
Actresses from Indiana
1985 births
Bethel College (Indiana) alumni
21st-century American women